The Vortex Tower was the working name of a London skyscraper design by Make Architects, a London-based business headed by Ken Shuttleworth. The Vortex Tower was proposed for the edge of the City of London outer eastern fringe, but was never built.

The planned shape of the Vortex Tower was a hyperboloid of revolution. The structure would have twisted into a spiral shape with a tapering centre and wide base. The project was based on a different concept, with rotation enabling the use of leaning columns as straight structural elements of hyperboloid.

Shuttleworth expressed surprise when the design was compared to that of the similar Kobe Port Tower, built in Japan in 1963.
He said "I haven't seen it before and it was not a source of inspiration for the Vortex." and noted that the Kobe designers "did not use the full envelope of the building", and that the towers would be different colours.

See also
 Hyperboloid structure
 List of hyperboloid structures

References

External links
The Vortex

Make proposes 300-metre Vortex for London
London architect’s vision for tall buildings

Skyscrapers in the City of London
Hyperboloid structures
Unbuilt buildings and structures in the United Kingdom
Unbuilt skyscrapers